Dondas is a commune in the Lot-et-Garonne department in south-western France. Its area is 14.37 km2 with about 214 inhabitants.

See also
Communes of the Lot-et-Garonne department

References

Communes of Lot-et-Garonne